State Road 571 (NM 571) is a  state highway in the US state of New Mexico. NM 571's southern terminus is at NM 215 in Las Placitas, and the northern terminus is at NM 554 in El Rito.

Major intersections

See also

References

571
Transportation in Rio Arriba County, New Mexico